Holger Brück (born 30 September 1947) is a German former professional football player and later manager. He played as a defender. In 1983, he played for the Calgary Mustangs of the Canadian Professional Soccer League.

References

1947 births
Living people
German footballers
KSV Hessen Kassel players
Hertha BSC players
Calgary Boomers players
Association football defenders
Bundesliga players
2. Bundesliga players
German expatriate footballers
Expatriate soccer players in Canada
German expatriate sportspeople in Canada
German football managers
KSV Hessen Kassel managers
Calgary Mustangs (CPSL) players
Canadian Professional Soccer League (original) players